Associação Desportiva de Fafe (abbreviated as AD Fafe) is a Portuguese football club based in Fafe in the district of Braga in northern Portugal.

Background
AD Fafe currently plays in the Campeonato Nacional de Seniores – Série A which is the third tier of Portuguese football. The club was founded in 1958 as a merger of SC Fafe and FC Fafe and they play their home matches at the Parque Municipal dos Desportos in Fafe which was constructed in 1968. The stadium is able to accommodate 8,000 spectators.

Improved facilities off the pitch were matched by better performances on the pitch and the club successively moved up divisions. Just as the club was celebrating its 30th anniversary, it achieved a first ever first division promotion after finishing runner-up in the second division, in 1987–88.

In the subsequent top flight campaign, Fafe finished 16th and was immediately relegated, but did manage a shock 0–0 draw at F.C. Porto. In 1990–91's second division, the club managed to sign 18-year-old Rui Costa (on loan from S.L. Benfica), who managed 38 games with 6 goals before "returning home".

The next few years were tough because Fafe dropped down two divisions in a couple of years, managing promotion from the fourth level to the third in 1996, where they remained for over a decade. In 2007–08, under manager Carlos Condeço the club finished 11th.

The club is affiliated to Associação de Futebol de Braga and has entered the national cup competition known as Taça de Portugal on many occasions, reaching the semifinals twice, in 1977 and 1979.

Appearances
Tier 1: 1
II Divisão: 32
III Divisão: 15
Taça de Portugal: 41

Season to season

Point total history

{|class="wikitable"
|-bgcolor="#efefef"
! Divisions/Leagues
! Pl.
! W
! T
! L
! GS
! GL
! Pts.
|-
|align=center|1.ª Liga / Divisão
|align=center bgcolor=silver|38
|align=center|9||align=center|14||align=center|15||align=center|29
|align=center|47||align=center|32
|-
|align=center|2.ª Liga / Honra
|align=center bgcolor=silver|0
|align=center|0||align=center|0||align=center|0||align=center|0
|align=center|0||align=center|0
|-
|align=center|2.ª Divisão
|align=center bgcolor=silver|114
|align=center|435||align=center|329||align=center|350||align=center|?
|align=center|?||align=center|1301
|-
|align=center|3.ª Divisão
|align=center bgcolor=silver|318
|align=center|152||align=center|89||align=center|63||align=center|?
|align=center|?||align=center|460
|-
|}

Honours
Terceira Divisão: 1995/96

Current squad

Chairmen

Footnotes

External links
Official website 

 
Football clubs in Portugal
Association football clubs established in 1958
1958 establishments in Portugal
Primeira Liga clubs
Liga Portugal 2 clubs